Caladenia fitzgeraldii, commonly known as Fitzgerald's spider orchid, is a plant in the orchid family Orchidaceae and is endemic to New South Wales and the Australian Capital Territory. It is a ground orchid with a single hairy leaf and usually only one greenish-yellow and red flower.

Description
Flowering occurs from August to November.

Taxonomy and naming
Caladenia fitzgeraldii was first formally described by Herman Rupp in 1942 and the description was published in Australian Orchid Review.

Distribution and habitat
Fitzgerald's spider orchid grows in forest in rocky soil in the Australian Capital Territory and the Wellington-Bathurst area of New South Wales.

References

fitzgeraldii
Plants described in 1942
Endemic orchids of Australia
Orchids of New South Wales
Taxa named by Herman Rupp